Tanairí is a 1985 telenovela produced in Puerto Rico with a plot regarding slavery on the island while under Spanish rule.  Tanairí is the setting for the series, the name of the hacienda where the story takes place.  The series theme song "Soledad" was performed by Nydia Caro. One of the directors of Tanairi was the well known playwright, Dean Zayas.

Cast 
Juan Ferrara	 ... 	Gustavo Medina
Von Marie Mendez	... 	Soledad Arizmendi
Rolando Barral	... 	Florencio Arizmendi, Soledad's father 
Raúl Reyes León ... young Gustavo Medina 
Von Marie Freyre ...  young Soledad Arizmendi
Braulio Castillo, Jr.	... 	Pedro Antonio
Iris Chacón	... 	Providencia 
Ernesto Concepción	... 	El Fiscal 
Ofelia D'Acosta	... 	Emperatriz 
Alba Nydia Díaz	... 	Altagracia 
Viviana Falcon	... 	Maria Luisa
Gilda Haddock	... 	Cecilia 
Julio Axel Landrón	... 	Rosendo 
Maria Esther Lasalle	... 	Cambucha 
Guillermo Leiva	... 	Notario Medina 
Armando Martinez	... 	Celso 
Samuel Molina	... 	Baldomero 
Eileen Navarro	... 	Maria Isabel 
Roberto Rivera Negrón	... 	Father Olegario 
Marina Perez	... 	Dolorita 
José Reymundi	... 	Father Eugenio 
Carmen Belen Richardson	... 	Mariba 
Orlando Rodriguez	... 	Tomas 
Luz María Rondón	... 	Sor Herminia
Mercedes Sicardo	...	Adele
Pedro Orlando Torres	... 	Rev. Patrick Moore

References

External links

Tanairí on Univision

1985 telenovelas
Puerto Rican telenovelas